The 12949 / 12950 Porbandar–Santragachi Junction Kavi Guru Express is a Superfast Express train of the Kavi Guru series belonging to Indian Railways – Western Railway zone that runs between  and  in India.

It operates as train number 12949 from Porbandar to Santragachi Junction and as train number 12950 in the reverse direction, serving the states of Gujarat, Maharashtra, Chhattisgarh, Odisha, Jharkhand and West Bengal.

Coaches

The 12949 / 12950 Porbandar–Santragachi Junction Kavi Guru Express has 1 AC 2 tier, 5 AC 3 tier, 10 Sleeper class, 1 Pantry Car, 4 General Unreserved & 2 SLR (Seating cum Luggage Rake) coaches. .

As is customary with most train services in India, coach composition may be amended at the discretion of Indian Railways depending on demand.

Service

As the average speed of the train is above , as per Indian Railways rules, its fare includes a Superfast surcharge.

Routing

Schedule

Traction

As sections of the route are yet to be fully electrified, a Vatva-based WDM-3A / WDM-3D locomotive hauls the train from Porbandar until  handing over to a  based WAP-4 locomotive which then powers the train for the remainder of its journey.

See also

 Kavi Guru Express
 13015/16 Howrah–Bhagalpur Kavi Guru Express
 13027/28 Howrah–Azimganj Kavi Guru Express
 19709/10 Udaipur City–Kamakhya Kavi Guru Express

References 

 http://media2.intoday.in/businesstoday/images/RailBudget_2011-12.pdf
 http://www.irfca.org/apps/locolinks/show/2455
 http://archive.indianexpress.com/news/six-new-trains-introduced-by-wr/875222/
 https://www.youtube.com/watch?v=4dOMw2hgfIk
 http://epaper.timesofindia.com/Default/Scripting/ArticleWin.asp?From=Search&Key=TOIKM/2011/11/13/5/Ad00507.xml&CollName=TOI_KoLKATA_ARCHIVE_2009&DOCID=397470&Keyword=%28%3Cmany%3E%3Cstem%3Eporbander%3Cand%3E%3Cmany%3E%3Cstem%3Ekavi%3Cand%3E%3Cmany%3E%3Cstem%3Eguru%3Cand%3E%3Cmany%3E%3Cstem%3Eexpress%29&skin=pastissues2&AppName=2&ViewMode=GIF
https://indiarailinfo.com/train/-train-porbandar-santragachi-kavi-guru-sf-express-12949/15580/1658/1724
https://indiarailinfo.com/train/timetable/santragachi-porbandar-kavi-guru-sf-express-12950/15583/1724/1658

External links

Transport in Porbandar
Rail transport in Howrah
Railway services introduced in 2011
Kavi Guru Express trains
Rail transport in Gujarat
Rail transport in Maharashtra
Rail transport in Chhattisgarh
Rail transport in Odisha
Rail transport in Jharkhand
Rail transport in West Bengal